Slap the Monster on Page One (Italian: Sbatti il mostro in prima pagina) is a 1972 Italian drama film directed by Marco Bellocchio.

It depicts the daily life of a fictitious Italian daily newspaper, Il Giornale (The Journal). The newspaper caters to a conservative, fascist, bourgeois readership, and its chief-editor Bizanti tries in all manners to give a right-wing slant even to the most trivial news items, while at the same time sweetening and desensitizing the thornier issues, such as unemployment and police brutality. The whole editorial staff is thrown in a tantrum when a young girl is found raped and killed, going as far as soliciting nostalgia for the death penalty (capital punishment was abolished in Italy in the wake of the fall of Italian Fascism) and to actually derail the investigation, leading the police to a false culprit: a young left-wing student, who becomes the 'ideal' scapegoat for the newspaper's prejudiced readership. The movie, a searing J'Accuse…! on the perils of press manipulation, closes with no happy ending in sight, with public opinion totally mesmerized by Bizanti and his cronies for the satisfaction of their backers and financers.

Two years after the movie's distribution, a right-wing newspaper called Il Giornale was actually started in Italy by Indro Montanelli.

Cast
Gian Maria Volonté as Bizanti
Laura Betti as Rita Zigai
Fabio Garriba as Roveda
John Steiner as Montelli
Corrado Solari as Mario Boni
Jacques Herlin as Lauri
Carla Tatò as Bizanti's Wife
Marco Bellocchio
Michel Bardinet as Vanzina
Jean Rougeul
Gianni Solaro
Enrico DiMarco
Silvia Kramar
Massimo Patrone as the real killer
Luigi Antonio Guerra

External links

1972 films
Italian drama films
1970s Italian-language films
Films directed by Marco Bellocchio
1972 drama films
Films set in Milan
Films set in the 1970s
Films about tabloid journalism
Films with screenplays by Sergio Donati
Films scored by Nicola Piovani
1970s Italian films